Avatar (from "Aerobic Vehicle for Transatmospheric Hypersonic Aerospace TrAnspoRtation") is a concept study for a robotic single-stage reusable spaceplane capable of horizontal takeoff and landing, by India's Defence Research and Development Organisation. The mission concept is for low cost military and commercial satellite space launches.

This spaceplane concept is unrelated to India's RLV Technology Demonstration Programme (RLV-TD).

Concept
The idea is to develop a spaceplane vehicle that can take off from conventional airfields. Its liquid air cycle engine would collect air in the atmosphere on the way up, liquefy it, separate oxygen and store it on board for subsequent flight beyond the atmosphere. The Avatar, a reusable launch vehicle, was first announced in May 1998 at the Aero India 98 exhibition held at Bangalore.

Avatar is projected to weigh 25 tons, of which 60% of that mass would be liquid hydrogen fuel. The oxygen required by the vehicle for combustion in outer space would be collected from the atmosphere during takeoff, thus reducing the need to carry oxygen during launch.

If built, Avatar would take off horizontally like a conventional airplane from a conventional airstrip using turbo-ramjet engines that burn hydrogen and atmospheric oxygen. During this cruising phase, an on-board system would collect air from the atmosphere, from which liquid oxygen would be separated and stored and used to burn the stored hydrogen in the final flight phase to attain orbit. The vehicle would be designed to permit at least one hundred launches and atmospheric reentries.

Feasibility study
The Avatar concept study was commissioned by India's Defence Research and Development Organisation in 2001. India's Space Agency ISRO has no connection with the project.  Air Commodore Raghavan Gopalaswami, who headed the study, made a presentation on the spaceplane at the global conference on propulsion at Salt Lake City, United States on July 10, 2001.

See also
Spaceplanes of comparable role, configuration and era
Boeing X-37
Buran
Dream Chaser
Skylon
Space Rider
Space Shuttle
SpaceShipTwo

References

External links
Concept of AVATAR

Hydrogen-powered aircraft
Hypersonic aircraft
Space launch vehicles of India
Space programme of India
Ramjet-powered aircraft
Former proposed space launch system concepts
Spacecraft propulsion
Spaceplanes
Proposed aircraft of India
V-tail aircraft
Satish Dhawan Space Centre